Oxford Township is one of twenty-four townships in Henry County, Illinois, USA.  As of the 2010 census, its population was 1,213 and it contained 554 housing units.

Geography

Cities, towns, villages
 Alpha
 Woodhull (partial)

Extinct towns
 Oxford at 
(These towns are listed as "historical" by the USGS.)

Adjacent townships
 Lynn Township (north)
 Clover Township (east)
 Ontario Township, Knox County (southeast)
 Rio Township, Knox County (south)
 North Henderson Township, Mercer County (southwest)
 Rivoli Township, Mercer County (west)
 Richland Grove Township, Mercer County (northwest)

Cemeteries
The township contains these four cemeteries: Alpha, Oxford, Saint Johns and Summit Level.

Major highways
  Interstate 74
  U.S. Route 150
  Illinois Route 17

Lakes
 Crescent Lake
 Skona Lake

Demographics

School districts
 Alwood Community Unit School District 225

Political districts
 Illinois's 17th congressional district
 State House District 74
 State Senate District 37

References
Notes

Bibliography
 United States Census Bureau 2008 TIGER/Line Shapefiles
 
 United States National Atlas

External links
 City-Data.com
 Illinois State Archives
 Township Officials of Illinois

Townships in Henry County, Illinois
Townships in Illinois